Marlies Hanschitz (born 12 March 1986) is an Austrian retired footballer who played as a midfielder. She has been a member of the Austria women's national team.

Club career
In 1994, the then 8-year-old Hanschitz started playing football at SK Austria Klagenfurt. After various club changes between SK Austria Klagenfurt and ATSV Wolfsberg, she switched to the girls' team at ASV St. Margarethen / L in 1999. Here the striker also scored the first goal in the Austrian Bundesliga. In 2005 she signed the Innsbruck AC. In 2006 the IAC women's team was taken over by FC Wacker Innsbruck. After two intermediate positions at SK KELAG Kärnten Frauen in 2010 and at FC St. Veit in 2011. In 2012 she returned to FC Wacker Innsbruck for one season. This was followed by an engagement with SV Neulengbach. Most recently she played for SV Brixlegg in the Tyrolean Women's League.

International career
Between 2003 and 2013, Hanschitz played 45 games for the senior Austria women's national football team. In these games, she scored 8 goals and was captain a few times. She capped during the 2011 FIFA Women's World Cup qualification and the UEFA Women's Euro 2013 qualifying.

Honours

Club
SV Neulengbach
ÖFB-Frauenliga: 2013–14

References

1986 births
Living people
People from Wolfsberg
Footballers from Carinthia (state)
Austrian women's footballers
Women's association football midfielders
SV Neulengbach (women) players
Austria women's international footballers